Arch Linux is an independently developed, x86-64 general-purpose Linux distribution that strives to provide the latest stable versions of most software by following a rolling-release model. The default installation is a minimal base system, configured by the user to only add what is purposely required.

Pacman, a package manager written specifically for Arch Linux, is used to install, remove and update software packages.

Arch Linux uses a rolling release model, meaning there are no "major releases" of completely new versions of the system; a regular system update is all that is needed to obtain the latest Arch software; the installation images released every month by the Arch team are simply up-to-date snapshots of the main system components.

Arch Linux has comprehensive documentation, consisting of a community-run wiki known as the ArchWiki.

History 
Inspired by CRUX, another minimalist distribution, Judd Vinet started the Arch Linux project in March 2002. The name was chosen because Vinet liked the word's meaning of "the principal," as in "arch-enemy".

Originally only for 32-bit x86 CPUs, the first x86_64 installation ISO was released in April 2006.

Vinet led Arch Linux until 1 October 2007, when he stepped down due to lack of time, transferring control of the project to Aaron Griffin.

The migration to systemd as its init system started in August 2012, and it became the default on new installations in October 2012. It replaced the SysV-style init system, used since the distribution inception.

The end of i686 support was announced in January 2017, with the February 2017 ISO being the last one including i686 and making the architecture unsupported in November 2017. Since then, the community derivative Arch Linux 32 can be used for i686 hardware.

On 24 February 2020, Aaron Griffin announced that due to his limited involvement with the project, he would, after a voting period, transfer control of the project to Levente Polyak. This change also led to a new 2-year term period being added to the Project Leader position.

In March 2021, Arch Linux developers were thinking of porting Arch Linux packages to x86_64-v3. x86-64-v3 roughly correlates to Intel Haswell era of processors.

In April 2021, Arch Linux installation images began including a guided installation script by default.

In late 2021, the Arch Linux developers released Pacman 6.0, which enabled parallel downloads.

In February 2022, the Arch Linux developers began offering debug packages.

Repository security 
Until Pacman version 4.0.0, Arch Linux's package manager lacked support for signed packages. Packages and metadata were not verified for authenticity by Pacman during the download-install process. Without package authentication checking, tampered-with or malicious repository mirrors could compromise the integrity of a system. Pacman 4 allowed verification of the package database and packages, but it was disabled by default. In November 2011, package signing became mandatory for new package builds, and as of the 21st of March 2012, every official package is signed.

In June 2012, package signing verification became official and is now enabled by default in the installation process.

Design and principles 
Arch is largely based on binary packages. Packages target x86-64 microprocessors to assist performance on modern hardware. A ports/ebuild-like system is also provided for automated source compilation, known as the Arch Build System.

Arch Linux focuses on simplicity of design, meaning that the main focus involves creating an environment that is straightforward and relatively easy for the user to understand directly, rather than providing polished point-and-click style management tools — the package manager, for example, does not have an official graphical front-end. This is largely achieved by encouraging the use of succinctly commented, clean configuration files that are arranged for quick access and editing. This has earned it a reputation as a distribution for "advanced users" who are willing to use the command line.

Installation 

The Arch Linux website supplies ISO images that can be run from CD or USB. After a user partitions and formats their drive, a simple command line script (pacstrap) is used to install the base system. The installation of additional packages which are not part of the base system (for example, desktop environments), can be done with either pacstrap, or Pacman after booting (or chrooting) into the new installation.

An alternative to using CD or USB images for installation is to use the static version of the package manager Pacman, from within another Linux-based operating system. The user can mount their newly formatted drive partition, and use pacstrap (or Pacman with the appropriate command-line switch) to install base and additional packages with the mountpoint of the destination device as the root for its operations. This method is useful when installing Arch Linux onto USB flash drives, or onto a temporarily mounted device which belongs to another system.

Regardless of the selected installation type, further actions need to be taken before the new system is ready for use, most notably by installing a bootloader and configuring the new system with a system name, network connection, language settings, and graphical user interface.

Arch Linux does not schedule releases for specific dates but uses a "rolling release" system where new packages are provided throughout the day. Its package management allows users to easily keep systems updated.

Occasionally, manual interventions are required for certain updates, with instructions posted on the news section of the Arch Linux website.

Guided automated install script 
An experimental guided installer named archinstall is included in all Arch ISO images released since 2021. It allows users to easily install and configure Arch Linux including drivers, disk partitioning, network configuration, accounts setup, and installation of desktop environments.

Package management
Arch Linux's only supported binary platform is x86_64. The Arch package repositories and User Repository (AUR) contains 58,000 binary and source packages, which comes close to Debian's 68,000 packages; however, the two distributions' approaches to packaging differ, making direct comparisons difficult. For example, six out of Arch's 58,000 packages comprise the software AbiWord, of which three in the user repository replace the canonical Abiword package with an alternative build type or version (such as sourcing from the latest commit to Abiword's source control repository), whereas Debian installs a single version of Abiword across seven packages. The Arch User Repository also contains a writerperfect package which installs several document format converters, while Debian provides each of the more than 20 converters in its own subpackage.

Pacman

To facilitate regular package changes, Pacman (a contraction of "package manager") was developed by Judd Vinet to provide Arch with its own package manager to track dependencies. It is written in C.

All packages are managed using the Pacman package manager. Pacman handles package installation, upgrades, downgrades, removal and features automatic dependency resolution. The packages for Arch Linux are obtained from the Arch Linux package tree and are compiled for the x86-64 architecture.

Pacman typically uses binary packages with a .pkg.tar.zst extension,
(for zstd compression), with .pkg placed before this to indicate that it is a Pacman package (giving .pkg.tar.zst);
though other compression formats are also valid, such as .pkg.tar.xz.

For example, packages can be installed via pacman -S , while pacman -Syu can also be used to perform a full system upgrade.

As well as Arch Linux, Pacman is also used for installing packages under MSYS2 (a fork of Cygwin) on Windows.

Repositories
The following official binary repositories exist:
core, which contains all the packages needed to set up a base system. Packages in this repository include kernel packages and shell languages. 
extra, which holds packages not required for the base system, including desktop environments and programs. 
community, which contains packages built and voted on by the community; includes packages that have sufficient votes and have been adopted by a "trusted user".
multilib, a centralized repository for x86-64 users to more readily support 32-bit applications in a 64-bit environment. Packages in this repository include Steam and Wine. 
Additionally, there are testing repositories which include binary package candidates for other repositories. Currently, the following testing repositories exist:
testing, with packages for core and extra.
community-testing, with packages for community.
multilib-testing, with packages for multilib.
The staging and community-staging repositories are used for some rebuilds to avoid broken packages in testing. The developers recommend not using these repositories for any reason, stating that any system updating from them will "unquestionably break."

There are also two other repositories that include the newest version of certain desktop environments.
gnome-unstable, which contains packages of a new version of the software from GNOME before being released into testing.
kde-unstable, which contains packages of a new version of KDE software before being released into testing.
The unstable repository was dropped in July 2008 and most of the packages moved to other repositories. In addition to the official repositories, there are a number of unofficial user repositories.

The most well-known unofficial repository is the Arch User Repository, or AUR, hosted on the Arch Linux site. The AUR does not host binary packages but instead a collection of build scripts known as PKGBUILDs. PKGBUILD scripts are executed by the makepkg command, which downloads the necessary files from the software's repository and builds them using the Arch Build System.

The Arch Linux repositories contain both libre and nonfree software, and the default Arch Linux kernel contains nonfree proprietary blobs, hence the distribution is not endorsed by the GNU project. The linux-libre kernel can be installed from the AUR or by enabling Parabola's repositories.

Arch Build System (ABS)
The Arch Build System (ABS) is a ports-like source packaging system that compiles source tarballs into binary packages, which are installed via Pacman. The Arch Build System provides a directory tree of shell scripts, called PKGBUILDs, that enable any and all official Arch packages to be customized and compiled. Rebuilding the entire system using modified compiler flags is also supported by the Arch Build System. The Arch Build System makepkg tool can be used to create custom pkg.tar.zst packages from third-party sources. The resulting packages are also installable and trackable via Pacman.

Arch User Repository (AUR)
In addition to the repositories, the Arch User Repository (AUR) provides user-made PKGBUILD scripts for packages not included in the repositories. These PKGBUILD scripts simplify building from source by explicitly listing and checking for dependencies and configuring the install to match the Arch architecture. Arch User Repository helper programs can further streamline the downloading of PKGBUILD scripts and associated building process. However, this comes at the cost of executing PKGBUILDs not validated by a trusted person; as a result, Arch developers have stated that the utilities for automatic finding, downloading and executing of PKGBUILDs will never be included in the official repositories.

Users can create packages compatible with Pacman using the Arch Build System and custom PKGBUILD scripts. This functionality has helped support the Arch User Repository, which consists of user contributed packages to supplement the official repositories.

The Arch User Repository provides the community with packages that are not included in the repositories. Reasons include:
Licensing issues: software that cannot be redistributed, but is free to use, can be included in the Arch User Repository since all that is hosted by the Arch Linux website is a shell script that downloads the actual software from elsewhere. Examples include proprietary freeware such as Google Earth and RealPlayer.
Modified official packages: the Arch User Repository also contains many variations on the official packaging as well as beta versions of software that is contained within the repositories as stable releases.
Popularity of the software: rarely used programs have not been added to the official repositories (yet).
Betas or "nightly" versions of the software which are very new and thus unstable. Examples include the "firefox-nightly" package, which gives new daily builds of the Firefox web browser.

PKGBUILDs for any software can be contributed by ordinary users and any PKGBUILD that is not confined to the Arch User Repository for policy reasons can be voted into the community repositories.

Derivatives 

There are several projects working on porting the Arch Linux ideas and tools to other kernels, including PacBSD (formerly ArchBSD) and Arch Hurd, which are based on the FreeBSD and GNU Hurd kernels, respectively. There is also the Arch Linux ARM project, which aims to port Arch Linux to ARM-based devices, including the Raspberry Pi, as well as the Arch Linux 32 project, which continued support for systems with 32-bit only CPUs after the mainline Arch Linux project dropped support for the architecture in November 2017.

Various distributions are focused around providing an Arch base with an easier install process, such as EndeavourOS, CachyOS, Manjaro and Garuda Linux.

SteamOS 3.0, the version of SteamOS used in Steam Deck by Valve, is based on Arch Linux.

Logo 
The current Arch Linux logo was designed by Thayer Williams in 2007 as part of a contest to replace the previous logo.

Reception 
OSNews reviewed Arch Linux in 2002. OSNews also has 5 later reviews about Arch Linux.

LWN.net wrote a review about Arch Linux in 2005. LWN.net also has 2 later reviews about Arch Linux.

Tux Machines reviewed Arch Linux in 2007.

Chris Smart from DistroWatch Weekly wrote a review about Arch Linux in January 2009. DistroWatch Weekly reviewed Arch Linux again in September 2009 and in December 2015.

The Linux kernel developer and maintainer Greg Kroah-Hartman (GKH) has stated that he uses Arch Linux and that it "works really really well," he has also praised the Arch Wiki, the distribution's rolling release model, and the feedback loop with the community.

In a 2023 DistroWatch poll, about half of the responders maintained that they were running either Arch (17%) or an Arch derivative (30%). As of 2023, Arch also enjoys the highest average rating of any Linux distribution on DistroWatch with a rating of 9.34.

See also 

 Comparison of Linux distributions
 List of Linux distributions

Notes

References

External links 

 
 Arch Linux on GitHub
  on Libera.chat

IA-32 Linux distributions
Pacman-based Linux distributions
Rolling Release Linux distributions
X86-64 Linux distributions
Linux distributions
Independent Linux distributions